The Invincible-class submarines, formally classified as the Type 218SG submarines, is a class of conventionally-powered attack submarines, ordered by the Republic of Singapore Navy (RSN) from German-based naval conglomerate ThyssenKrupp Marine Systems (TKMS). The Type 218SG is an extensively-customised derivative of the export-oriented Type 214 submarine, with specific design characteristics drawn from Type 212 submarines. They feature several capabilities, including a substantial level of automation, a significant payload capacity, enhanced underwater endurance and superlative ergonomics.

Singapore's Ministry of Defense (MINDEF) ordered four Type 218SG submarines - two in 2013 and two in 2017, as a replacement to the RSN's currently-serving  and  submarines. The first submarine - RSS Invincible, was launched in February 2019, and is expected to be commissioned by 2022. The RSN plans to have all four submarines in active service by 2024.

Design

Development
The design of the Type 218SG was jointly created by Defence Science and Technology Agency (DSTA), ThyssenKrupp Marine Systems (TKMS) and the Republic of Singapore Navy (RSN). The design of the submarines is highly customised—conceived to fulfill specific naval requirements of the RSN—including naval operations in littoral waters, guarding sea lines of communication (SLOC), intelligence-gathering (ISTAR) and special operations. The design is believed to be based on the Type 214 export-centric submarine, with design inferences from the Type 212 submarine—both of which were designed by TKMS. The design of the Type 218SG is also believed to have been influenced by the Type 216 submarine concept.

It has an estimated speed of about  while surfaced and  while submerged.

Features
The Type 218SG features several unique characteristics, such as :

 An X-shaped rudder configuration similar to that on the Type 212 submarines and the Dakar-class  submarine of the Israeli Navy, for effective maneuverability in Singapore's shallow littoral waters and the South China Sea—as opposed to the Type 214's cruciform rudder configuration.
 A fuel-cell powered air independent propulsion (AIP) module, which allows it to remain submerged for about 50% longer than the  submarines; several estimates put the Type 218SG's underwater endurance at about 28-42 days (4-6 weeks), without snorkelling.
 A Horizontal Multi-Purpose Airlock (HMPL)—which can be utilised to launch torpedoes, special operations forces, divers and submarine-launched cruise missiles (SLCM); the submarines also come with an option to integrate a "Vertical Multi-Purpose Airlock" (VMPL), for launching missiles vertically.
 Use of extensive ergonomical factors—such as air conditioning, enlarged living quarters, additional showering facilities, separate bunk beds, toilet cubicles, additional storage space and equipment unique to the physiques of the RSN's sailors.
 Extensive features of automation—such as a "Combat Management System" (CMS) jointly developed by Atlas Elektronik and ST Electronics and data analytics/decision-support engines developed by the DSTA—which allows the crew to operate the submarine on three 4-hour shifts (instead of two 6-hour shifts), thus allowing greater periods of rest during protracted underwater deployments. The high-level of automation also reduces the crew complement to just 28 (fewer than other contemporary conventional submarines).
 Utility of specific materials accustomed to Singapore's tropical climate and saline waters.
 A higher payload carrying capacity and greater firepower than the Challenger-class and Archer-class submarines, owing to its larger size.

Instrumentation

Armament
Current details about the Type 218SG's armament are scant; however, it is understood that the submarine features eight  and two  forward-firing torpedo tubes—which may be used for firing heavyweight torpedoes, anti-ship missiles and for laying naval mines.

The Type 218SG is reported to have a greater ordnance payload (and essentially greater firepower) than the RSN's previous submarines, owing to its much larger size.

Sensors
Details about the Type 218SG's sensors and automation are also scant; however, it is understood the submarines are equipped with a "Combat Management System" (CMS) jointly developed by German-based Atlas Elektronik and Singapore-based ST Electronics, along with data analytics and decision support engines developed by the DSTA. The high levels of sophisticated automation and decision-making systems allows the submarines to run on three 8-hour shifts (instead of two 12-hour shifts), thus allowing the crew more rest to endure prolonged underwater missions. 

Given its sophisticated equipment, each submarine is manned by only twenty-eight sailors—a number similar to the RSN's other submarines, but fewer than other contemporary conventional submarines.

History

Purchase
In November 2013, Singapore's Ministry of Defense (MINDEF) selected the Type 218SG design, offered by TKMS, as a replacement to the RSN's existing submarine fleet, siding an offer of three conventionally-powered submarines (presumably the ) from French-based naval conglomerate Direction des Constructions Navales (now Naval Group). On 29 November 2013, MINDEF officially contracted TKMS to supply two Type 218SG submarines, along with a training and logistics package, at an estimated cost of US$1.36 billion. The order for the two submarines bore noteworthy significance for being the RSN's first-ever order for new custom-built submarines, since the service had previously relied on the acquisitions of the second-hand Challenger-class and the Archer-class submarines. The purchase of the two submarines was officially announced on 2 December 2013. According to the terms of the contract, the two submarines were initially scheduled to be delivered between 2020 and 2021.

On 16 May 2017, Singapore's Minister for Defence Ng Eng Hen announced that the RSN had placed an additional order for two more Type 218SG submarines, with additional arrangements of logistics and crew-training, bringing the total number of its ordered submarines to four. According to the terms of the contract, the two additional submarines are to be delivered between 2024 and 2025. In January 2023, it was reported that the cost of the purchase would be USD$1.8 billion.

In December 2021, German news outlet Der Spiegel reported that the German government, headed by then-outgoing Chancellor Angela Merkel, had sanctioned a series of last-minute arms deals, including the export of an additional Type 218SG to Singapore. However the Singapore government, the RSN and TKMS have not officially confirmed the additional submarine.

Construction
The construction of the first submarine began in 2014, with a steel cutting ceremony at TKMS' shipyard in Kiel. The first submarine, christened as the Invincible, was launched in an elaborate ceremony on 18 February 2019, with defense minister Ng Eng Hen and representatives of the RSN in attendance.  During the ceremony, Ng revealed the names of the other three submarines, namely - Impeccable, Illustrious and Inimitable. Invincible began its sea trials in September 2020, with its planned delivery date scheduled for 2020. However, in June 2020, Ng announced that the delivery of Invincible had been postponed to 2022, owing to restrictions caused by the COVID-19 pandemic.

The construction of the second ordered batch began in January 2018, commencing with the steel-cutting ceremony of the third submarine, Illustrious, at Kiel, with representatives from TKMS and the DSTA in attendance.

In April 2021, German news outlet Lübecker Nachrichten reported that a Type-218SG submarine, presumably the Invincible or the Impeccable, had suffered an outbreak of fire during its sea trials. However, the submarine in question did not appear to have sustained severe damage, nor were the crew of 28 aboard at the time reported to have sustained injuries.

In November 2022, while hosting German chancellor Olaf Scholz, Singapore's prime minister Lee Hsien Loong revealed that the second and third submarines of the class, namely, Impeccable and Illustrious, would be launched in December of that year. The launch ceremony of the two submarines, which was conducted in Kiel on 13 December, was attended by Scholz, Lee, his spouse Ho Ching and Vivian Balakrishnan – Singapore's minister of foreign affairs. The two submarines are expected to be delivered to the RSN by 2023, while the fourth submarine, Inimitable, remains under construction.

Ships in class

See also

Submarines of similar comparison era and comparison
 Type 212CD submarine—A class of diesel-electric attack-submarines exclusively being built for the German Navy and the Royal Norwegian Navy.
 —An upcoming class of next-generation attack submarines being developed for the Israeli Navy.
 KSS-III submarine—A three-pronged series of diesel-electric attack submarines currently being built for the Republic of Korea Navy.
 —A class of export-oriented diesel-electric attack submarines, jointly developed by Naval Group and Navantia and currently operated by the Chilean Navy, the Royal Malaysian Navy, the Indian Navy and the Brazilian Navy.
 S-80 Plus submarine—A class of conventionally-powered attack submarines currently being built for the Spanish Navy.
 —An upcoming class of next-generation attack submarines being developed for the Swedish Navy.
 —A class of diesel-electric attack submarines currently being built for the Japan Maritime Self-Defense Force.
 —A class of diesel-electric attack submarines currently being built for the Russian Navy.

Other references to the Republic of Singapore Navy
 List of ships of the Republic of Singapore Navy

References

Attack submarines
Submarine classes
Submarines of Germany
Proposed ships